Boano Island is an island in West Seram Regency, Maluku Province, Indonesia. It is located off the northern coast of the Hoamoal Peninsula at the western end of Seram Island, across the Boano Strait. The inhabitants speak the Boano language, Luhu, as well as Indonesian and Ambonese Malay.

Pua Island, highest point 403 m, is located close off Boano's northwestern tip.

Geography
Boano is  mostly flat in the east and north, rising to hills in the west and south. In the northwest, is the long and narrow Pua Island, separated from Boano by the narrow Valentine Strait, which is interspersed with coral reefs in many places. 

Boano has a tropical rainforest climate (Köppen climate classification Af). The island is divided into two villages (desa), whose border is disputed. At the 2020 Census, the population in South Buano was 1,741 while in North Buano (including Pulau Pua) was 8,287 inhabitants. The main access to the island is by sea.

History
Boano is mentioned by Dutch naturalist and author François Valentijn, in his book Beschryvinge van Amboina in 1724 as Bunoa, Boan, Boano, and Bonnoa, along with a listing of the names of various villages and their leaders. At that time, he estimated to have been inhabited by 1,200 people most of whom were subsistence farmers. Valentijn also mentioned the peace talks between Herman van Speult of the Dutch East India Company (VOC) and a local ruler named Sengadji in 1619.

The Hoamoal Peninsula region in western Seram was a center of the spice trade since before the 17th century's and Buano Island had the advantage of being a safe harbor during the west monsoon season. In the 17th century, Buano Island and the Hoamoal Peninsula were subject to the Sultanate of Ternate. Islam also spread in this area at that time. Today, Islam tends to dominate the northern part of Buano while Protestant Christianity is concentrated in the south. When the VOC consolidated its monopoly on the spice trade in Maluku, there were several rebellions, including the Hoamoal War which also involved Buano in 1639. The VOC succeeded in winning the war and in 1656, and subsequently carried out forced displacement of residents to various regions in western Seram in an effort to quell further rebellion. Many inhabitants of Buano were forcibly relocated to Manipa Island. In 1675, Ternate made a treaty with the VOC, withdrawing its claims against the Ambon and surrounding areas including Buano. Until 1917, Boano was listed as an area of the West Seram Onderafdeling, Afdeling Seram, Governorate of Ambon.

The island did not receive significant attention in the later stage of Dutch colonization. After the capture of the Netherlands East Indies by Japan during World War II in 1942, Boano, together with the rest of the Moluccas, was assigned to the zone of occupation of the Japanese 2nd Fleet. The occupation formally ended in August 1945; however, the newly-proclaimed Republic of Indonesia was unable to establish its power in such a remote region, and in early 1946 the Netherlands regained control of Boano without resistance. A few months later, Boano, along with all the Moluccas, Sulawesi and the Lesser Sunda Islands, was included in the quasi-independent State of East Indonesia. In December 1949. The decision to incorporate East Indonesia into the Republic of Indonesia in April 1950 was opposed by many inhabitants, leading to the proclamation of the Republic of South Moluccas, which included Boano. The succession was crushed by the Indonesian military by the end of 1950 and Boano was proclaimed part of the Republic of Indonesia.
 
In 1983, sectarian rioting broke out when several North Buano residents attacked South Buano. Several people were killed and a number of buildings in South Buano were burned. In 1999 during the Maluku sectarian conflict, further violence erupted.

References

Islands of the Maluku Islands
Landforms of Maluku (province)
Geography of Seram Island
Populated places in Indonesia